William Bacon Camp (November 25, 1913 – November 13, 1975) was Comptroller of the Currency from 1966 to 1973. He was born in Greenville, Texas.

Camp, a national bank examiner, was appointed Comptroller by President Lyndon Johnson. During his term, a rapidly growing economy led to a dramatic increase in the assets held by national banks.

The agency's remaining responsibility in the issue of currency - redeeming Federal Reserve notes - was transferred to the Treasurer of the United States. Camp is unique among Comptrollers: he was nominated by a president from one political party and renominated by a president, Richard Nixon, from another. He died on November 13, 1975 in Rockville, Maryland.

References

United States Comptrollers of the Currency
Comptrollers in the United States
1975 deaths
1913 births
Members of the United States Assay Commission
Chairs of the Federal Deposit Insurance Corporation
Lyndon B. Johnson administration personnel
Nixon administration personnel